Jesús Adrián Romero Ibarra is a Mexican musician, author and singer from Hermosillo.

Romero is the founder and president of Vástago Producciones, a record label dedicated to the production and distribution of music with a Christian message.  Vástago Producciones also organizes and promotes concerts with Latin Christian music.

He currently resides in Monterrey, Mexico.

Throughout his musical career he has won several awards and been nominated for three Latin Grammy Awards.

Biography 
Jesús Adrián Romero studied the bible in his course studies, after which he was assigned to be a pastor for a 16-year period. Over a span of three years, he completed his work of spiritual guidance in the congregation of the Church of God, in Van Nuys, California, while also attending seminary.

Later, he founded the Christian community (of a charismatic tendency): "Amistad y Vida" (Friendship and Life) in Agua Prieta, Sonora. Now, Amistad y Vida is under the direction of Pastor Omar Molina. Jesús Adrián was also the assistant pastor in Vino Nuevo in Ciudad Juárez, Chihuahua for four years, under the direction of Pastor Victor Richards, where he oversaw cell groups and directed one of the congregation's worship groups. For three years, he was the director of the worship group De Hombre a Hombre (From Man to Man) and traveled with them across Mexico, directing the congregations' praises "from man to man".

According to Romero, after having prayed for a few years and considering other cities in the United States, Jesús Adrián and Pecos Romero decided that Phoenix, Arizona was the place where God wanted them to start a new congregation and present their music. In August 2007, Jesús Adrián and his family moved to Phoenix, Arizona to check out the city and plan the beginning of Vástago Epicentro (Epicenter Stem). After their move, about 20 families moved from other cities in the United States and Mexico to support them in their vision.

Discography 
 "Grupo Creacion" Jesus Adrian Romero – 1989
 Renuevo Espiritual (Spiritual Renewal) – 1990
 Unidos Por La Cruz (United by the Cross) – 1996
 Cerca de Ti (Close to You) – 1998
 Con Manos Vacías (With Empty Hands) – 2000
 A Sus Pies (At His feet) – 2002
 Te Daré Lo Mejor (I Will Give You the Best) – 2004
 Unplugged (Double Disc) – 2005
 El Aire de tu Casa (The Air of Your House) – 2005
 Ayer Te Vi... Fue Mas Claro Que La Luna (Yesterday I Saw You... It Was Clearer Than the Moon) – 2007
 El Brillo De Mis Ojos (The Brightness of My Eyes) – 2010
 El Brillo De Mis Ojos-Edicion Especial (The Brightness of My Eyes-Special Edition) – 2010
 Duetos (Duets) – 2011
 Soplando Vida (Breathing Life) – Album Release › May 2012Besos En La Frente (Kisses on the Forehead) – 2016Origen y Esencia (Origin and Essence) – 2019

 Compilations 
 Colección Adoración de Jesús Adrián Romero – Vol. 1 (The Best of Jesús Adrián Romero – Worship Collection) – 2003
 Colección Alabanza de Jesús Adrián Romero – Vol. 1 (The Best of Jesús Adrián Romero – Praise Collection) – 2003
 Colección Adoración 2 de Jesús Adrián Romero (The Best of Worship of Jesús Adrián Romero – Worship Collection 2) – 2006
 Navidad con Vástago (Christmas with Vástago) – 2008
 Colección Duetos (Duets Collection) – 2011

 Video 
 Te Daré Lo Mejor – 2004 (DVD)
 Unplugged – 2005 (DVD)
 El Aire de tu Casa – 2007 (DVD)
 Ayer Te Vi... Fue Mas Claro Que La Luna – 2008 (DVD)
 Soplando vida – 2012 (DVD)

 Duets 
 Alex Campos
 Rocio Cereceres
 Marcela Gándara
 Lilly Goodman
 Orlando Hernandez
 Melissa Romero
 Pecos Romero
 Daniel Santoy
 Marcos Vidal
 Marcos Witt
 Abel Zavala
 Funky & Redimi2
Centro de Alabanza
 Exito Hasta acabar mi Viaje con Rocío – 2012 (DVD)

Musicians and members 

Current
 Jesus Molina – piano
 Hoover Ilaber – acoustic guitar
 Pedro Marin – bass guitar
 Misael Blanco – drums
 Fernando Ramírez – electric guitar
 Roberto Serrano – percussion
 Eduardo Contreras – sound engineer

Former
 Mike Rodriguez – piano, music director, record producer
 Daniel Fraire – acoustic guitar, record producer
 Kiko Cibrian – electric guitar, record producer

References

External links 
 

1965 births
Living people
Mexican Christians
Mexican male singers
Mexican performers of Christian music
Musicians from Sonora
People from Hermosillo
Singers from Sonora